Gaṇitasārasan̄graha (Compendium on the gist of Mathematics) is a mathematics text written by Māhāvīrācharya. It is first text completely written on mathematics with questions asked in it being completely different from one asked in previous texts composed in Indian subcontinent.
In the 9th century, during Amoghavarsha's rule Mahaviracharya wrote Ganitsara sangraha which is the first textbook on arithmetic in present day. The book describes in details the current method of finding Lowest Common Multiple (LCM).

Structure
 Sangyaādhikāra (Terminology)
 Parikarmavyāvhār (Arithmetical operations)
 Kālaswarnavyavhār (Fractions)
 Prakīrñakvyavhār (Miscellaneous problems)
 Trairāshik (Rule of three)
 Miśravyavhār (Mixed problems)
 Kśetragaṇit vyavhār (Measurement of Areas)
 Khātvyavhār (calculations regarding excavations)
 Chāyāvyavhār (Calculations relating to shadows)

Quotes 

The work praises mathematics as follows:

लौकिके वैदिके वापि तथा सामयिकेऽपि यः।
व्यापारस्तत्र सर्वत्र संख्यानमुपयुज्यते॥

Meaning: All the extant things in three worlds can’t exist without their foundation being in mathematics.

The end of the first chapter Sangyaādhikāra describes the following eight qualities of a mathematician:

लघुकरणोहापोहानालस्यग्रहणधारणोपायैः।
व्यक्तिकरांकविशिष्टैर् गणकोऽष्टाभिर् गुणैर् ज्ञेयः॥

References

Bibliography 

 

History of mathematics
Jain texts

Sanskrit texts